The men's trampoline competition at the 2020 Summer Olympics took place on 31 July 2021 at the Ariake Gymnastics Centre.

Schedule
All times are in Japan Standard Time (UTC+9)

Results

Qualification

Final

References

trampoline
2020
Men's events at the 2020 Summer Olympics